Ectomesenchymal chondromyxoid tumor (ECT) is a benign intraoral tumor with presumed origin from undifferentiated (ecto)mesenchymal cells. There are some who think it is a myoepithelial tumor type.

Controversies about origin 
 Derived from ectomesenchymal cells migrating from neural crest (there is immunophenotypic support for this theory).
 Equivalent to soft tissue myoepithelioma. There is morphologic and immunohisthochemical support for this theory, with some authors advocating interchangeable terms.

Signs and Symptoms 
Patients present with a painless, slow-growing mass usually within the tongue (most commonly the anterior dorsal tongue). There is an intact surface epithelium.

Management 
 Surgical excision is the treatment of choice, with recurrences only when there is incomplete excision.

Pathology findings

Macroscopic 
 Submucosal circumscribed but not encapsulated nodular mass, often with entrapped muscle bundles at the edge. It may have a gelatinous appearance. Most tumors are small, up to 2 cm (given the confines of the tongue, a larger mass would cause significant clinical problems).

Microscopic Pathology 
 Submucosal unencapsulated but well-delineated or circumscribed nodule, often separated from the periphery and internally by fibrous connective tissue bands. The cells are arranged in cords, nests, and net-like sheets. The cells may extend into and entrap soft tissue structures including skeletal muscle and nerve bundles.
 The tumor is made up of small round, oval, spindle, or stellate cells that have a very monotonous appearance. There are small dark nuclei with variably amounts of light to basophilic cytoplasm.
 Nuclear pleomorphism, multinucleation, and mitotic figures are usually not seen. Atypical mitoses and necrosis is absent.
 There is a background stroma composed of chondromyxoid to myxoid material. Sometimes large cells are seen in chondroid or cartilaginous areas. Swirling formations give the appearance of neural tissue.
 Importantly, there is an absence of glands or myoepithelial components.

Immunohistochemistry 
 Positive:  Glial fibrillary acidic protein (GFAP), pancytokeratin, and S100 protein. Smooth muscle actin may be positive in about 50% of cases.
 Negative:  Epithelial membrane antigen, desmin, p63 and calponin.

Ancillary Studies 
 Alcian blue will give a blue staining to the stromal matrix material. 
 Mucicarmine will also highlight the stromal matrix (pink).
 There is a specific recurrent RREB1-MKL2 gene fusion present in these tumors.

Differential diagnoses 
The tumor is quite unique, but other tumors are considered in the differential diagnosis histologically. They included pleomorphic adenoma, myoepithelioma, myxoid neurofibroma, neurothekeoma (nerve sheath myxoma), chondroid choristoma, extraskeletal myxoid chondrosarcoma, focal oral mucinosis, and an ossifying fibromyxoid tumor of soft parts.

Epidemiology 
Exceedingly rare, this tumor develops in a wide age range, although often in young patients without a sex predilection. The vast majority develop within the anterior dorsal tongue, with palate and base of tongue rarely affected.

References

Further reading 
 

Salivary gland neoplasia